Murray Hill is an unincorporated community located within portions of both Berkeley Heights and New Providence, located in Union County in northern New Jersey, United States.

It is the longtime central location of Bell Labs (part of Nokia since 2016), having moved there in 1941 from New York City when the division was still part of Western Electric. The first working transistor was demonstrated in Bell Labs' Murray Hill facility in 1947.

The neighborhood shares its ZIP code 07974 with the neighboring borough of New Providence.

Murray Hill was named and founded by Carl H. Schultz, founder of a mineral water business once located at First Avenue between 25th and 26th Streets in the Murray Hill district of Manhattan. Schultz purchased a large tract of land there during the 1880s where he built a residence for his family and donated land to be used for a train station with the condition that the area be known as "Murray Hill".

Corporate residents
C. R. Bard, a manufacturer of surgical equipment.
United States headquarters of The Linde Group, (formerly The BOC Group), the world's largest industrial gases company.

Transportation
Mass transit to Murray Hill is available via the New Jersey Transit Gladstone Branch train line to the Murray Hill or Summit stations. Passengers heading to Nokia Bell Labs can take the 986 bus route to shuttle between the facility and the train station.

See also
Passaic River Parkway

References

Berkeley Heights, New Jersey
New Providence, New Jersey
Unincorporated communities in Union County, New Jersey
Unincorporated communities in New Jersey